Sulphur Springs or Sulfur Springs may refer to the following locations:

United States:
Sulphur Springs, Alabama
Sulphur Springs Valley, Arizona
Sulphur Springs, Arkansas (disambiguation), several locations
Sulphur Springs, Indiana
Sulphur Springs, Crawford County, Indiana
Sulphur Springs, Indian Territory (modern Oklahoma)
Sulphur Springs, Iowa
Sulphur Springs, Missouri
Sulphur Springs was an early name for the village of Clifton Springs, New York
Sulphur Springs, Ohio
Sulphur Springs, Tampa, Florida. 
Sulphur Springs, Texas
Sulphur Springs Valley, in Cochise County, Arizona
Elsewhere
Sulphur Springs, Saint Lucia
Schwefelquelle Östringen, Germany.

In fiction:

 Secrets of Sulphur Springs, set in the fictional Louisiana town of Sulphur Springs

See also
 Sulphur Spring
 White Sulphur Springs (disambiguation)
 Mineral spring, of which a sulphur spring is one type